GNOME Web, called Epiphany until 2012 and still known by that code name, is a free and open-source web browser based on the GTK port of Apple's WebKit rendering engine, called WebKitGTK. It is developed by the GNOME project for Unix-like systems. It is the default and official web browser of GNOME, and part of the GNOME Core Applications.

Despite being a component of GNOME, Web has no dependency on GNOME components, so it can be potentially installed on any system supporting GTK and WebKitGTK.

GNOME Web is the default web browser on elementary OS and Bodhi Linux version 5.

History

Naming 
GNOME Web was originally named "Epiphany", but was rebranded in 2012 as part of GNOME 3.4. The name Epiphany is still used internally, as its code name, for development and in the source code. The package remains epiphany-browser in Debian (to avoid a name collision with a video game that is also called "Epiphany") and epiphany in Fedora.

Development

Galeon 

Marco Pesenti Gritti, the initiator of Galeon, originally developed Epiphany in 2002 as a fork of Galeon. The fork occurred because of the disagreement between Gritti and the rest of Galeon developers about new features. While Gritti regarded Galeon's monolithic design and the number of user-configurable features as factors limiting Galeon's maintainability and usability, the rest of the Galeon developers wanted to add more features.

Around the same time, the GNOME project adopted a set of human interface guidelines, which promoted simplification of user interfaces. As Galeon was oriented towards power users, most developers disapproved. As a result, Gritti created a new browser based on Galeon, with most of the non-critical features removed. He intended Epiphany to comply with the GNOME HIG. As such, Epiphany used the global GNOME theme and other settings from inception.

Gritti explained his motivations:

Galeon continued after the fork, but lost momentum due to the remaining developers' failure to keep up with changes in the Mozilla platform. Galeon development stalled and the developers decided to work on extensions to bring Galeon's advanced features to Epiphany.

Gritti ended his work on Epiphany and a GNOME team led by Xan Lopez, Christian Persch and Jean-François Rameau now direct the project. Gritti died of cancer on May 23, 2015.

Gecko-based 
The first version of Epiphany was released on December 24, 2002.

Epiphany initially used the Gecko layout engine from the Mozilla project to display web pages. It provided a GNOME graphical user interface for Gecko, instead of Mozilla's cross-platform interface.

The development of Epiphany was mainly focused on usability improvements compared to major browsers at the time. The most notable was the new text entry widget, which was introduced in version 1.8. The new widget supported icons inside the text area and reduced the screen space needed to present information, while improving GNOME integration.

The next major milestone was version 2.14, which was the first to follow GNOME's version numbering. It also featured network awareness using NetworkManager, smart bookmarks improvements, and the option to build with XULRunner.

The latter was critical. Previously, Epiphany could only use an installed Mozilla web browser as a web engine provider. The XULRunner support made it possible to install Epiphany as the only web browser on the system.

WebKit-based 

The development process suffered from major problems related to the Gecko backend. Notably, the release cycles of the two projects did not line up efficiently. Also, Mozilla increasingly disregarded third-party software that wished to make use of Gecko, until it became viewed as an integrated Firefox component. To address these issues, in July 2007, the Epiphany team added support for WebKit as an alternative rendering engine. On , the team announced that it would remove the ability to build it using Gecko and proceed using only WebKit.

The size of the team and complexity of porting the browser to WebKit caused version 2.22 to be re-released with bugfixes alongside GNOME 2.24, so the releases stagnated until , when it was announced that 2.26 would be the final Gecko-based version.

In September 2009, the transition to WebKit was completed as part of GNOME 2.28.

Version history 
Developers of GNOME Web maintain a complete and accurate changelog in its official repository that shows complete and detailed changes between all the releases, following table just shows arbitrarily mentioned some notable and important changes:

Features 

As a component of GNOME Core Applications, it provides full integration with GNOME settings and other components like GNOME Keyring to securely store passwords, following the GNOME Human Interface Guidelines and the GNOME software stack to provide first-class support for the all new-adopted edge technologies such as Wayland and the latest major GTK versions, multimedia support using GStreamer, small package size (2.6MB) and very fast execution/startup time due to using shared components; other features include the reader mode, mouse gestures, smart bookmarks, praised web application integration mechanism, built-in ad blocking, the "Insert Emoji" option in the context menu for quick and easy inserting of Emoji and Miscellaneous Symbols and Pictographs into the text boxes, Google Safe Browsing, supports reading and saving MHTML, an archive format for web pages that combines all the files of web pages into only one single file; and consume fewer system resources than the major cross-platform web browsers.

Web standards support 
The underlying WebKit browser engine provides support for HTML 4, XHTML, CSS 1 and 2, most of HTML 5 and CSS 3, and a Web Inspector (web development debugging tool).

Encrypted Media Extensions support is not a goal, as the standard does not specify a Content Decryption Module to use, all available modules are proprietary even if licensing is possible, and the system imposes Digital Rights Management that hides what the user's computer is doing to make copying "premium content" difficult. However, Media Source Extensions is supported, as YouTube began to require this technology in November 2018.

Apple, which is the primary corporate backer of WebKit, rejected at least 16 web APIs because they could be used in a fingerprinting attack to help personally identify users and track them, while providing limited or no benefit to the user. As HTML5test checks for most of these APIs, it artificially lowers WebKit's "score" in points (as does lack of DRM support).

Web once supported NPAPI plug-ins, such as Java and Adobe Flash, but support was removed in GNOME 3.34. In the modern web platform, these have fallen out of favor and support has been removed from all major browsers. Flash has been deprecated by Adobe itself. Flash had gained infamy throughout the years for usability and stability issues, incessant security vulnerabilities, its proprietary nature, its ability to let sites deploy particularly obnoxious web ads, and Adobe's poor and inconsistent Linux support. Many of these issues were raised by Steve Jobs, then CEO of Apple, in his essay Thoughts on Flash.

GNOME integration 

Web reuses GNOME frameworks and settings, including the user interface theme, network settings, and printing. Settings are stored with GSettings and GNOME default applications are used for internet media types handling. The user configures these, centrally, in GNOME's settings app.

The built-in preference manager for Web presents basic browser-specific settings while advanced settings which could radically alter Web's behavior can be changed with utilities such as dconf (command line) and dconf-editor (graphical).

Web follows the GNOME Human Interface Guidelines and platform-wide design decisions. For example, in Web 3.4, the menu for application actions was moved to the GNOME Shell's top panel application menu and the menu bar was replaced with "super menu" button, which triggers the display of window-specific menu entries.

Since GNOME 3.32, Web can adjust to various form factors with the help of libhandy, a library sponsored by Purism. It supports desktop, tablet and phone form factors. ("Narrow Mode").

Ad blocking 
Since GNOME 3.18, Web is configured to block ads and pop-ups by default. In GNOME 3.34, the existing ad blocker was removed. This code was only partially functional and had been the source of many bugs. Web adopted the "Content Blockers" system from the WebKit engine.

One of the developers, Adrián Pérez de Castro, compared the old and new ad blockers. He found that the switch saved approximately 80 MiB of RAM per browser tab.

Google Safe Browsing and security sandboxing 
Since GNOME 3.28, Web has support for Google Safe Browsing, to help prevent users from visiting malicious websites.

Since GNOME 3.34, Web explicitly requires a minimum of WebKitGTK 2.26 or later. This provides the "Bubblewrap Sandbox" for tab processes, which is intended to prevent malicious websites from hijacking the browser and using it to spy on other tabs or run malicious code on the user's computer. If such code found another exploit in the operating system allowing it to become root, the result could be a disaster for all users of the system.

Making the sandbox a priority was brought on, according to Michael Catanzaro, because he was particularly concerned with the code quality of OpenJPEG and the numerous security problems that had been discovered in it, including many years of failing security reviews by Ubuntu. He further explained that web compatibility requires that sites believe that Web is a major browser. Sending them the user agent of Apple Safari causes fewer broken websites than others (due to sharing the WebKit engine), but also causes caching servers to deliver JPEG 2000 images, of which Safari is the only major browser to support. There is no other usable open source option for JPEG 2000 support. Fixing OpenJPEG, which is the official reference software, will be a massive undertaking that could take years to sort out. Enabling the Bubblewrap Sandbox would cause many vulnerabilities in this and other components to become "minimally useful" to potential attackers.

In GNOME 3.36, Web gained native support for PDF documents by using PDF.js. Michael Catanzaro explained that having websites open Evince to display PDF files was insecure, as it could be used to escape the browser's security sandbox. Since Evince was the last user of NPAPI, this allowed the remaining support code for the obsolete plug-in model (where additional vulnerabilities could be hiding) to be removed. Since the NPAPI support had a hard dependency on X11, moving to PDF.js also allowed that dependency to be dropped.

Since PDF.js internally converts PDF documents so that they can be displayed by the web browser's engine, it does not add security vulnerabilities to the browser the way that compiled plug-ins such as Adobe Acrobat or Evince could.

Bookmark management 

While most browsers feature a hierarchical folder-based bookmark system, Web uses categorized bookmarks, where a single bookmark (e.g. this page) can exist in multiple categories (such as "Web Browsers", "GNOME", and "Computer Software"). A special category includes bookmarks that have not yet been categorized. Bookmarks, along with browsing history, are accessed from the address bar in find-as-you-type manner.

Smart bookmarks 
Another innovative concept supported by Web (though originally from Galeon) is "smart bookmarks". These take a single argument specified from the address bar, or from a textbox in a toolbar.

Web Application Mode 

Since GNOME 3.2, released in September 2011, Web allows creating application launchers for web applications. The subsequent invocation of a launcher brings up a plain site-specific browser (single instance) of Web limited to one domain, with off-site links opening in a normal browser. The launcher created this way is accessible from the desktop and is not limited to GNOME Shell. For instance it may be used with Unity, used on Ubuntu. This feature facilitates the integration of the desktop and World Wide Web, which is a goal of Web's developers. Similar features can be found in the Windows version of Google Chrome. For the same purpose Mozilla Foundation previously developed a standalone application Mozilla Prism, which was superseded by the project Chromeless.

Web applications are managed within the browser's main instance. The applications can be deleted from the page, accessible with a special URI about:applications. This approach was supposed to be a temporary while a centralized GNOME web application management was to be implemented in GNOME 3.4, but this never happened.

Firefox Sync 
Since GNOME 3.26, Web has support for Firefox Sync, which allows users to sync their bookmarks, history, passwords, and open tabs with Firefox Sync, which can then be shared between any copy of Firefox or Web that the user signs into Firefox Sync with.

Extensions  
Web once supported extensions and a package was maintained containing the official ones. This was later removed due to problems with stability and maintainability.

Some popular extensions, such as ad blocking, were moved to the core application.

The project has expressed an interest in implementing support for the WebExtension add-on format used by Chrome, Firefox, and some other major browsers, if interested contributors can be found.

Reception 

In reviewing the WebKit-powered Epiphany 2.28 in September 2009, Ryan Paul of Ars Technica said "Epiphany is quite snappy in GNOME 2.28 and scores 100/100 on the Acid3 test. Using WebKit will help differentiate Epiphany from Firefox, which is shipped as the default browser by most of the major Linux distributors."

In reviewing Epiphany 2.30 in July 2010, Jack Wallen described it as "efficient, but different" and noted its problem with crashes. "When I first started working with Epiphany it crashed on most sites I visited. After doing a little research (and then a little debugging) I realized the issue was with JavaScript. Epiphany (in its current release), for some strange reason, doesn't like JavaScript. The only way around this was to disable JavaScript. Yes this means a lot of features won't work on a lot of sites – but this also means those same sites will load faster and won't be so prone to having issues (like crashing my browser)." Wallen concluded positively about the browser, "Although Epiphany hasn't fully replaced Chrome and Firefox as my one-stop-shop browser, I now use it much more than I would have previously. [It has a] small footprint, fast startup, and clean interface."

In March 2011, Veronica Henry reviewed Epiphany 2.32, saying "To be fair, this would be a hard sell as a primary desktop browser for most users. In fact, there isn't even a setting to let you designate it as your default browser. But for those instance where you need to fire up a lighting-fast browser for quick surfing, Epiphany will do the trick." She further noted, "Though I still use Firefox as my primary browser, lately it seems to run at a snail's pace. So, one of the first things I noticed about Epiphany is how quickly it launches. And subsequent page loads on my system are equally as fast." Henry criticized Epiphany for its short list of extensions, singling out the lack of Firebug as a deficiency. Web instead supports Web Inspector offered by the WebKit engine, which has similar functionality.

In April 2012, Ryan Paul of Ars Technica used Web as an example to his criticism of GNOME 3.4 design decisions: "Aside from the poor initial discoverability of the panel menu, this model works reasonably well for simple applications. [...] Unfortunately, it doesn't scale well in complex applications. The best example of where this approach can pose difficulties is in GNOME's default Web browser. [...] Having the application's functionality split across two completely separate menus does not constitute a usability improvement." This was addressed in later versions, with a single unified menu.

In an October 2016 review, Bertel King Jr. noted on MakeUseOf, "Later versions offer the best integration you will find with GNOME Shell. It lacks the add-ons found in mainstream browsers, but some users will like the minimalism, the speed, and the tab isolation that prevents one misbehaving site from crashing the entire browser."

In an April 2019 review, Bertel King Jr. wrote another article on MakeUseOf, this time reviewing GNOME Web for its Web Applications Mode. He stated, "When you check your email, you’re using a web app. If you open YouTube, Netflix, or Spotify in a browser, again, you’re using a web app. These days, you can replace most of your desktop apps with web apps. [...] GNOME Web provides tools to better integrate web apps with the rest of your desktop, so you can open them via your app launcher and view them in your dock or taskbar. This way they feel more like apps and less like sites." He also praised the security provided by walling off Web Applications from the rest of the browser and each other. Like Mozilla's container feature, this helps prevent sites such as Facebook from seeing what the user is doing in the main browser. It also allows the user to create multiple "apps" for the same site, to easily switch between different accounts.

See also 
 
 Midori, another web browser formerly based on GTK and WebKitGTK
 List of web browsers for Unix and Unix-like operating systems

References

External links

 
 complete change-log
 Firefox vs GNOME Web
 Frequently asked questions (FAQ)

2002 software
Free software programmed in C
Free web browsers
GNOME Core Applications
MacOS web browsers
POSIX web browsers
Software based on WebKit
Software forks
Software that uses Meson
Web browsers that use GTK